The Bank of Australia was a failed financial institution of early colonial New South Wales formed in 1826 by a producers' and merchants' group as a rival to the Bank of New South Wales. It was dubbed the "pure merino" bank because its share register included the plutocracy of the colony but excluded the ex-convicts who had been associated with the Bank of New South Wales. When investors responded to the depression of the late 1830s by the abrupt withdrawal of capital leading to a chain of insolvencies, a number of colonial banks found that their unrestricted lending had sent prices land soaring as speculators borrowed to invest especially in urban areas. When the banks called in these loans further insolvencies occurred and a number of banks, including the Bank of Australia, failed in 1843. A number of leading colonial figures lost their fortunes with many taking advantage of the Insolvent Debtors Act 1841.

Opening 
The bank opened on 3 July 1826 in George Street, Sydney. The first directors of the bank were: Thomas Macvitie (managing director), Edward Wollstonecraft, John Macarthur, Richard Jones, Thomas Icely, John Oxley, George Bunn, W.J. Browne, Hannibal Macarthur, James Norton, and A.B. Spark.

1828 bank theft 

In September 1828, thieves tunnelled into the Bank of Australia in Lower George Street, Sydney and stole about £14,000 pounds, described in 2008 as "the largest documented bank theft" in Australian history (in relative values and expressed as a proportion of GDP).

References 

History of Australia (1788–1850)
Economic history of Australia
Defunct banks of Australia
Banks established in 1826
Banks disestablished in 1843
1843 disestablishments in Australia
Australian companies established in 1826